Presidential elections were held in Rwanda on 24 December 1978, a week after the country's new constitution was approved in a referendum. The constitution had made the country a one-party state with the National Revolutionary Movement for Development (MRND) the sole legal party. Its leader, incumbent President Juvénal Habyarimana, who had taken power in the 1973 coup d'état, was the only candidate. The results showed 99% of votes in favour of his candidacy.

Results

References

Presidential elections in Rwanda
1978 in Rwanda
One-party elections
Rwanda
Single-candidate elections
Election and referendum articles with incomplete results
December 1978 events in Africa